Pier Francesco Valentini (c.1570-1654) was an Italian nobleman, amateur composer and music theorist. He studied with G. B. Nanino. His tour de force on the art of the contrapuntal canon was Canone nel modo Salomonis (1631) a 96-voice contrapuntal exercise which could be expanded to a symbolically significant 144,000 voices, singing at different speeds and in different metres. He also published more conventional madrigal and motet collections.

References

1570s births
1654 deaths
Pupils of Giovanni Maria Nanino